is a Japanese actress and voice actress.

Personal life

Filmography
1994: It's a Summer Vacation Everyday - Adult voice of Horsetail (voice only)
1996: Gamera 2: Attack of Legion - Additional Role - (Kaiju film)

Voice roles

Anime
Bigman - Heaven Woman Static
Eureka Encyclopedia large - Kanako

OVA
2001 Ya Monogatari - Karen

Anime films
Legend of the Galactic Heroes - Annerose von Grunewald 
Legend of the Galactic Heroes Golden Wings - Annerose von Grunewald
Toki no Tabibito -Time Stranger- - Teko Saotome

Games
Castlevania: Rondo of Blood - Tera
Shenmue - Shenhua's Mother

References

External links

1965 births
Living people
Japanese voice actresses